Jan TV is a satellite television channel from India owned by CSL Infomedia Pvt. Ltd. It was inaugurated by the Chief Minister of Rajasthan, Mr.Ashok Gehlot on 13 May 2012 in Jaipur.

Management
Jan TV Editor-In-Chief is Mr. Surendra Kumar Surana, who is also the Director of CSL Infomedia Private Limited

Programs
Jan TV telecasts Hindi news, education, employment, agriculture and entertainment programs. Jan TV is available live all over the world through live streaming on its portal.

Some of the popular programs on Jan TV are:

 Computer Shaala
 Satellite Education
 News and Current Affairs
 Dharti Ugle Sona
 Gulistaan
 Crime Report
 Bollywood Express
 Yadoo Ka Safar
 Medi Talk
 Jan Surbhi
 Ek Mulakaat
 33 Zila 33 Khabar
 Raag Sarita
 Roshani Ka Safar
 World This Week

See also
 List of Hindi-language television channels

References

  JAN TV on Telecom Regulatory Authority of India website
  JAN TV on Ministry of Information and Broadcasting of India website
  जन टीवी उत्तर प्रदेश औऱ मध्य प्रदेश मे करेगा विस्तार
  JAN TV channel in Rajasthan
  Compucom Software's subsidiary inaugurates JanTV, a satellite TV channel
  JAN TV reference in Dainik Bhaskar
  मीडिया मिर्ची  |   जन टीवी का भव्य आगाज, मुख्यमंत्री अशोक गहलोत ने किया उद्घाटन

External links
 Official website

24-hour television news channels in India
Hindi-language television channels in India
Television channels and stations established in 2012
Mass media in Rajasthan